Jimmy Lewis may refer to:
 Jimmy Lewis (musician) (1937–2004), American soul musician
 Jimmy Lewis (bassist) (1918–2000), American jazz, R&B and soul bass player
 Jimmy Lewis (lacrosse), American lacrosse player
 Jimmy Lewis (cricketer) (born 1962), former English cricketer
 Jimmy Lewis (surfer), American surfer and windsurfer
 Jimmy Lewis (musician), (born 1982), Australian musician/audio engineer
 James "Jimmy" Lewis, fictional character from video game Rage of the Dragons

See also
Jim Lewis (disambiguation)
James Lewis (disambiguation)